Esmé Stewart, 1st Duke of Lennox, 1st Earl of Lennox, 6th Seigneur d'Aubigny,  (26 May 1583) of the Château d'Aubigny at Aubigny-sur-Nère in the ancient province of Berry, France, was a Catholic French nobleman of Scottish ancestry who on his move to Scotland at the age of 37 became a favourite of the 13-year-old King James VI of Scotland (and later I of England), of whose father, Henry Stewart, Lord Darnley (son and heir apparent of Matthew Stewart, 4th Earl of Lennox), he was a first cousin. Despite his conversion to Calvinism he was never trusted by the Scots and returned to France where he ended his days. Sir James Melville described him as "of nature upright, just and gentle". He was the first to popularise the firstname Esmé (spelt also Edme, etc.) in the British Isles.

Early life
He was the son and heir of John Stewart, 5th Seigneur d'Aubigny (d. 1567), by his wife Anne de la Queuille, a French noblewoman. His father was the third son of John Stewart, 3rd Earl of Lennox and his mother was the youngest daughter, and co-heiress, of  François de la Queuille.

His father had inherited (through adoption from his great uncle Sir Robert Stewart, 4th Seigneur d'Aubigny (–1544), the French Seigneurie (lordship of the manor) of Aubigny and its estates, including the Château d'Aubigny at Aubigny-sur-Nère in the ancient province of Berry, central France, built by him, also the nearby secondary seat of Château de la Verrerie.

Career
He spent much of his life in France,  and succeeded his father as 6th Seigneur d'Aubigny on 31 May 1567. At the age of 37 he came to Scotland, where he was introduced to his first cousin once removed, the 13-year-old James VI of Scotland, when the latter made his formal entry into Edinburgh and began his personal rule. Esmé was an exotic visitor who fascinated the young James, who began to shower him with rewards and preferments. He was appointed to the Privy Council of Scotland, and on 5 March 1580, he was created Lord Darnley and Earl of Lennox (which title, having been inherited by King James from his paternal grandfather, had merged into the crown), with remainder to the heirs male of his body failing which to revert to the King. On 5 August 1581, he was created Lord Aubigny, Dalkeith, Torboltoun and Aberdour, Earl of Darnley and Duke of Lennox, with a similar remainder, as well as other favours.

Esmé Stewart's rise to power was resisted by the followers of the Earl of Morton, the former Regent of Scotland. An English diplomat, Nicolas Errington was at Stirling Castle in April 1580 when there were rumours of a palace coup. Errington reported that Esmé Stewart and his 24 armed followers barricaded themselves overnight in his rooms in the castle.

James VI gave Esmé Stewart jewels that remained from the collection of Mary, Queen of Scots, including in June 1581 a gold belt or chain of knots of pearls and diamonds, and in October 1581 a gold cross with diamonds and rubies, the "Great Harry" or "Great H of Scotland", a chain of rubies and diamonds, with a diamond "carcan" necklace with roses of gold and a pair of matching hair garnishings, another suite of carcan and back and fore hair garnishings, and other pieces. The gift was witnessed by Elizabeth Stewart, Countess of Arran, and officials of the wardrobe.

During his rise, he was careful to maintain his popularity with the Burgh administrators of Scotland's towns. For example, in July 1580 the English diplomat Robert Bowes reported that Lennox had obtained fishing rights in Aberdeen, which the deposed Regent Morton had given to his servant George Auchinleck of Balmanno, and had then arranged for the King to give this valuable source of income to the town.

In Presbyterian Scotland, the thought of a Catholic duke irked many, and Lennox had to make a choice between his Catholic faith and his loyalty to the king. Lennox chose the latter, who taught him the doctrines of Calvinism. Nevertheless, the Church of Scotland remained suspicious of Lennox after his public conversion and took alarm when he had the Earl of Morton tried and beheaded on charges of treason.

Ruthven Raid and exile
In response, the Scottish nobles plotted to oust Lennox. They did so by luring James to Ruthven Castle as a guest where they kept him as a prisoner for ten months. The Lord Enterprisers then forced James to banish Lennox. A lengthy denunciation of Lennox was issued from Stirling Castle on 17 September 1582, citing his religion, association with the murderers of Henry Stuart, Lord Darnley (King James's father) and Regent Moray and Regent Lennox and his control over the royal household and international intrigue. Lennox stayed for a while at Dumbarton Castle. In December whilst travelling south from Berwick on Tweed, by chance near Northallerton he encountered the French ambassador, M. de la Mothe Fénelon, who was travelling northward to treat with the Gowrie Regime. In London the Scottish poet William Fowler pumped Lennox for information which he sent to Francis Walsingham.

Return to France
Lennox returned to France where he started a secret correspondence with King James. He met a frosty reception in France as an apostate. Although the Scottish nobles believed that they would be proved right in their belief that Lennox's conversion was artificial following his return to France, he remained a Presbyterian.

His final letter to James Stewart, Lord Doune, requested him to take care of his son and to recover his former possessions in Scotland for his benefit. After Lennox's death William Schaw took his heart back to King James in Scotland, followed by his wife and eldest son Ludovic Stewart. King James had repeatedly vouched for Lennox's religious sincerity and memorialized him in a poem called "Ane Tragedie of the Phoenix", which compared him to an exotic bird of unique beauty killed by envy. King James I regarded all Lennox's family with great affection, and instructed his son King Charles I to do well by them. Charles faithfully fulfilled this obligation, and as a result, the Lennox family had considerable influence at the Scottish and English Courts over the next two generations.

Personal life
Around 1572, Lennox married his mother's fourth cousin, Catherine de Balsac (d. ), the ninth daughter of Guillaume de Balsac, Sieur d'Entragues, by his wife Louise d'Humières. By Catherine he had five children:

 Lady Gabrielle Stewart, a nun in Glatigny, France.
 Lady Henrietta Stewart (–1642), who married George Gordon, 1st Marquess of Huntly and had issue.
 Ludovic Stewart, 2nd Duke of Lennox (1574–1624), eldest son and heir who married three times.
 Esmé Stewart, 3rd Duke of Lennox (1579–1624), second son, heir to his elder brother.
 Lady Marie Stewart (–1644) (Countess of Mar), who married John Erskine, Earl of Mar (1558–1634) and had issue.

Lennox died in Paris on 26 May 1583 and was succeeded by his eldest son, Ludovic (who married three times without legitimate issue). His widow outlived Lennox by many years and spent her later life at the family estate at Aubigny, where she was largely entrusted with the upbringing of their grandchildren, before she died sometime after 1630.

Titles
31 May 1567: Seigneur d'Aubigny
5 March 1579/80: Earl of Lennox, Lord Darnley and Dalkeith;
5 August 1581: Duke of Lennox, Earl of Darnley, Lord Dalkeith, Torboltoun and Aberdour.

References

Further reading

1542 births
1583 deaths
101
Esme Stewart, 1st Duke of Lennox
Lord Chamberlains of Scotland
Scottish royal favourites
Scottish people of French descent
Converts to Calvinism from Roman Catholicism
16th-century Scottish peers